The year 1864 in science and technology included many events, some of which are listed here.

Astronomy
 May 14 – The Orgueil meteorite, composed of carbonaceous chondrite, falls in southwestern France.
 August 29 – William Huggins is the first to take the spectrum of a planetary nebula when he analyzes NGC 6543.

Botany
 English botanist Richard Spruce completes a 15-year expedition to the Andes and Amazon Basin during which he has collected more than 30,000 plant specimens.

Chemistry
 August 20 – John Alexander Reina Newlands produces the first periodic table of the elements.
 November 27 – Barbituric acid is first synthesized, by German chemist Adolf von Baeyer.
 Lothar Meyer develops an early version of the periodic table, with 28 elements organized by valence.
 Cato Maximilian Guldberg and Peter Waage, building on Claude Louis Berthollet's ideas, propose the law of mass action.

Conservation
 June 30 – The Yosemite Grant is created in the United States.

Mathematics
 Alfred Enneper publishes his parametrization of the Enneper surface in connection with minimal surface theory.

Physics
 December 8 – James Clerk Maxwell presents his paper A Dynamical Theory of the Electromagnetic Field to the Royal Society in London, treating light as an electromagnetic wave and presenting Maxwell's equations.

Technology
 February 17 – In the American Civil War, the tiny Confederate hand-propelled submarine H. L. Hunley sinks the USS Housatonic using a spar torpedo in Charleston Harbor, becoming the first submarine to sink an enemy ship (although the submarine and her crew of eight are also lost).
 December 8 – The Clifton Suspension Bridge across the Bristol Avon in England, designed by Isambard Kingdom Brunel and completed as a memorial to him, opens to traffic.
 Oriel Chambers, Liverpool, England, the world's first metal-framed glass curtain walled building, designed by Peter Ellis (architect), is built.
 Nicolaus Otto and Eugen Langen produce a free piston gas atmospheric engine.
 Henry Roscoe and Robert Bunsen carry out what is reputed to be the first flashlight photography, using magnesium as a light source.
 Possible date – Siegfried Marcus builds the first motorized cart, in Vienna.

Zoology
 The species Homo neanderthalensis is formally described by William King.
 The Central Park Zoo opens in New York City as a menagerie.

Awards
 Copley Medal: Charles Darwin
 Wollaston Medal for Geology: Roderick Murchison

Births
 January (prob. date) – George Washington Carver (died 1943), African American agricultural botanist.
 January 13 – Wilhelm Wien (died 1928), German physicist.
 March 12 – W. H. R. Rivers (died 1922), English psychiatrist.
 March 15 – Carl Edvard Johansson (died 1943), Swedish metrologist.
 April 21 – Max Weber (died 1920), German sociologist.
 June 14 – Alois Alzheimer (died 1915), German neuroscientist.
 June 25 – Walther Nernst (died 1941), German chemist.
 June 22 – Hermann Minkowski (died 1909), Lithuanian-German mathematician.
 September 8 (O.S. August 27) – Jakob Johann von Uexküll (died 1944), Baltic German pioneer of biosemiotics.
 December 1 – Carsten Borchgrevink (died 1934), Norwegian Antarctic explorer.

Deaths
 January 14 – Father Nicholas Callan (born 1799), Irish physicist.
 March 21 – Luke Howard (born 1772), English meteorologist and manufacturing chemist.
 May 3 – William Lobb (born 1809), English plant collector.
 May 5 – Elizabeth Andrew Warren (born 1786), Cornish botanist and marine algolologist.  
 May 29 – Johann Georg Bodmer (born 1786), Swiss mechanical engineer and inventor.
 November 23 – Friedrich Georg Wilhelm von Struve (born 1793), Baltic German-born astronomer.
 December 8 – George Boole (born 1815), English-born mathematician.
 December 12 – John Fowler (born 1826), English agricultural engineer.

References

 
Science, 1864 In
1860s in science
19th century in science